Johnathan Walton is the host of the podcast "Queen of the Con: The Irish Heiress" and is a vigilante who hunts down con artists. The first con artist Walton put in jail was Marianne Smyth aka Mair Smyth aka Marianne Clark  who scammed hundreds of thousands of dollars from 43 victims, including Walton himself, in the United States and Europe, using an elaborate series of confidence tricks. 

Walton also works as a reality TV producer on shows like American Ninja Warrior for NBC, Shark Tank for ABC and Savage Builds for the Discovery Channel.  His career in unscripted television was preceded by a 10-year stint as an Emmy Award-winning TV news reporter and producer at local stations KHOU-TV in Houston, Texas, KABB-TV in San Antonio, Texas and WSVN-TV in Miami, Florida.

Awards
Has won four Regional Emmys for his Primetime TV Specials for CBS Houston.
2006 Emmy for Walton's World Gone Wild aired Dec. 2005. KHOU-TV Houston Johnathan Walton, Reporter
2005 Emmy for The Best of Walton's World Strikes Back aired Dec. 2004. 
KHOU-TV Houston Johnathan Walton, Reporter
2004 Emmy for The Best of Walton's World Gone Wild 
KHOU-TV Johnathan Walton, Reporter 
 2003 Emmy for Christmas in Walton's World show.
2004 Texas Associated Press Broadcasters First Place Light Feature.
Numerous Houston Press Club Lone Star Awards
2003 Houston Chronicle Award for "Baffoon". Described as "A pudgy, puckish clown for the 21st century,"
2006 Houston Chronicle Award for Funny Person on Local TV. Described as "tickles us best"

Other Notables
Con Artist Marianne Smyth Documentary Website

References

1974 births
Living people
American people of Jamaican descent
Broward College alumni